The 2000 European Karate Championships, the 35th edition, was held in the sports complex of the National Indoor Arena in Istanbul, Turkey from May 2 to 4, 2000.

Medallists

Men's Competition

Individual

Team

Women's competition

Individual

Team

Medagliere

References

External links
 Karate Records - European Championship 2000

2000
International karate competitions hosted by Turkey
European Karate Championships
European championships in 2000
Sport in Istanbul
2000s in Istanbul
Karate competitions in Turkey
May 2000 sports events in Turkey